N69 may refer to:

Roads 
 N69 road (Ireland)
 A50 motorway (Netherlands)
 Negros Occidental Eco-Tourism Highway, in the Philippines
 Nebraska Highway 69, in the United States

Other uses 
 N69 (Long Island bus)
 Escadrille N.69, a unit of the French Air Force
 Gunbarlang language
 Northrop N-69 Snark, an American cruise missile
 Stormville Airport, in Dutchess County, New York, United States
 Yangman language